The Cinema Nuovo Olimpia is a small two screen art-house cinema in central Rome, notable as the location of the discovery of the Ara Pacis, discovered beneath the cinema building and excavated from beneath it in the 1930s.

Location of Cinema
It is part of a building called  Palazzo Peretti, now Palazzo Fiano, constructed by Pope Eugene IV between 1431 and 1447, located on a zig-zag bend on via in Lucina at its junction with via del Giardino Theodoli.  It backs onto the church of San Lorenzo in Lucina and only a two hundred yards from Palazzo Montecitorio the Italian Parliament Building and from via del Corso, the main thoughrofare through historic Rome.

Operation as a theatre
The first theatrical use of this space was as a ballet and marionette theatre called “Teatro Fiano”.   In the nineteenth century the theatre was named Teatro Olimpia.   In April 1898, Teatro Olimpia was listed as showing 'Reale Cinematografo Lumiere'.

Current cinematic operation
Nuovo Olimpia was refurbished in 1996/1997 by the architects Enrico Mastrangeli and Pierluigi Celata as an original language art-house cinema, and is operated by the Circuito Cinema, part of the Europa Cinemas Group.    The cinema has two screens with 275 and 90 seats respectively.    The cinema, re-opened in 1997 with Tom Cruise in "Eyes Wide Shut" and Wim Wender's "Buena Vista Social Club"

First pieces of the Ara Pacis discovered
The first pieces of the Ara Pacis were recovered in the 16th century, and various friezes were incorporated in renaissance structures such as Villa Medici on the Pincian Hill.   In 1566, the Tuscan Cardinal Giovanni Ricci di Montepulciano, also the superintendent of water acquired nine large blocks of curved marble from the altar and incorporated them into the walls of Villa Medici.

Nineteenth century
After this finds, we hear nothing more about the altar until 1859, when the Peretti Palace, which had by now become the property of the Duke of Fiano, needed structural work, during which the base of the altar was seen, and numerous other sculpted fragments, not all of which were extracted "due to the narrowness of the site and fear of endangering the walls of the palace". 
Numerous fragments of the spiralled frieze were recovered on this occasion.

Twentieth century
The Altar was finally recognised for what it was by Friedrich von Duhn and in 1903 a request was sent to the Ministry of Public Education to continue the excavations. Their success was made possible by the generosity of Edoardo Almagià, who, as well as giving his permission for the exploration, donated in advance whatever should be discovered underneath the palace and made an ongoing financial contribution to the expenses of the excavation.

Ambitious recovery project
In July 1903, after the work had been started, it quickly became obvious that the conditions were extremely difficult and that the stability of Teatro Olimpia might well be compromised.

When about half the monument had been examined and 53 fragments recovered, the excavation was called to a halt. In February 1937, the Italian Cabinet decreed that, as it was the two thousandth anniversary of the birth of Augustus, the excavations should recommence, using the most advanced technology.    Seventy cubic metres of ground under Cinema Nuovo Olimpia were frozen, whilst the altar was extracted.

The huge granite plinth of the Ara Pacis still lies under the Cinema Nuovo Olimpia today as engineers were never able to extract it.

External links
 The cinema chain ‘Circuito Cinema’
 Studio Mastrangeli – Celata
 Photographs of the Cinema newly restored in 1996/7
Ara Pacis Museum
History and photographs of the Ara Pacis

Cinemas in Italy
Tourist attractions in Rome